Pera Pedi is a village in the Limassol District of Cyprus, located 4 km south-east of Pano Platres.  The E802 road serves the village, and connects to Mandria in the West and Trimiklini in the East. It is the birthplace of president Nicos Anastasiades.

References

Communities in Limassol District